The magistrate's courts in Sri Lanka is a lower court headed by a magistrate who is vested with original criminal jurisdiction.

Jurisdiction 
Originally known as police magistrate's courts, current magistrate's courts are established under the Judicature Act, No. 2 of 1978 to each judicial division in Sri Lanka. The Minister in charge of the subject of Justice in consultation with the Chief Justice and the President of the Court of Appeal would define the territorial limits of each judicial division. At present there are 72 judicial divisions in Sri Lanka.

It has jurisdiction of; 
 criminal cases filed under the penal code and other laws within its jurisdiction.
 First mortem examinations.
 Post mortem examinations.
 Issue of Warrants of Judicial orders to arrest and produce suspected persons.
 Issue of search warrants.
 Ordering persons to enter into bonds of good conduct and preventive jurisdiction on public nuisance.
 
Every magistrate's court is vested with original criminal jurisdiction (other than in respect of offences upon indictment in the High Court), and is ordinarily empowered to impose sentences up to a fine of Rs. 1,500 and/or 2 years rigorous/simple imprisonment unless power is vested in the Magistrate's Court to impose higher penalties by special provision. Appeals from convictions, sentences or orders of Magistrate's Courts within a Province lie to the High Court of the Province. In judicial divisions which does not have primary courts, magistrate's courts exercise the jurisdiction of the Primary Courts.

Appointment and removal of magistrates
All magistrates are appointed by the Judicial Service Commission, which has power of dismissal and disciplinary control of the magistrates. Additional magistrates would be appointed to a magistrate's court. Magistrates would be seconded to municipal magistrate courts. The Chief Magistrates Court in Colombo is the senior of the magistrate's courts in the judicial division of Colombo.

Unofficial magistrates

In remote areas where there are only one magistrate and/or additional magistrate, unofficial magistrates (known as acting magistrates) would be appointed to site on behalf of the magistrate in his/her absence and postpone hearings to a later date.

List of magistrate's courts
 Magistrate's Court Akkraipattu
 Magistrate's Court Ampara
Magistrate's Court Angunukolapelessa
 Magistrate's Court Anuradhapura
 Magistrate's Court Attanagalla
 Magistrate's Court Avissawella
 Magistrate's Court Baddegama
 Magistrate's Court Badulla
 Magistrate's Court Balangoda
 Magistrate's Court Balapitiya
 Magistrate's Court Bandarawela
 Magistrate's Court Batticaloa
 Magistrate's Court Chavakachcheri
 Magistrate's Court Chilaw
 Magistrate's Court Colombo
 Magistrate's Court Dambulla
 Magistrate's Court Elpitiya
 Magistrate's Court Embilipitiya
 Magistrate's Court Fort
 Magistrate's Court Galagedara
 Magistrate's Court Galgamuwa
 Magistrate's Court, Galle
 Magistrate's Court Gampaha
 Magistrate's Court Gampola
 Magistrate's Court Gangodawila
 Magistrate's Court Hambantota
 Magistrate's Court Hatton
 Magistrate's Court Hingurakgoda
 Magistrate's Court Homagama
 Magistrate's Court Horana
 Magistrate's Court Jaffna
 Magistrate's Court Kaduwela
 Magistrate's Court Kalmunai
 Magistrate's Court Kalutara
 Magistrate's Court Kandy
 Magistrate's Court Kantale
 Magistrate's Court Kayts
 Magistrate's Court Kegalle
 Magistrate's Court Kekiwara
 Magistrate's Court Kesbewa
 Magistrate's Court Killinochchi
 Magistrate's Court Krebithigollawa
 Magistrate's Court Kuliyapitiya
 Magistrate's Court Kurunegala
 Magistrate's Court Maho
 Magistrate's Court Maligakanda
 Magistrate's Court Mallakam
 Magistrate's Court Mannar
 Magistrate's Court Marawila
 Magistrate's Court Matale
 Magistrate's Court Matara
 Magistrate's Court Matugama
 Magistrate's Court Mawanella
 Magistrate's Court Minuwangoda
 Magistrate's Court Moneragala
 Magistrate's Court Moratuwa
 Magistrate's Court Morawaka
 Magistrate's Court Mount Lavinia
 Magistrate's Court Mullativu
 Magistrate's Court Mutur
 Magistrate's Court Nawalapitiya
 Magistrate's Court Negombo
 Magistrate's Court Nuwara Eliya
 Magistrate's Court Panadura
 Magistrate's Court Point Pedro
 Magistrate's Court Polonnaruwa
 Magistrate's Court Pugoda
 Magistrate's Court Puttalam
 Magistrate's Court Ratnapura
 Magistrate's Court Ruwanwella
 Magistrate's Court Tangalle
 Magistrate's Court Teldeniya
 Magistrate's Court Thambuththegama 
 Magistrate's Court Tissamaharamaya
 Magistrate's Court Trincomalee
 Magistrate's Court Vauniya
 Magistrate's Court Wallawaya
 Magistrate's Court Walasmulla
 Magistrate's Court Warakapola
 Magistrate's Court Wariyapola
 Magistrate's Court Wattala
 Magistrate's Court Welimada

See also
 Unofficial magistrate
 Supreme Court of Sri Lanka
 Constitution of Sri Lanka

References

Law of Sri Lanka
Courts of Sri Lanka